Marisa Paige Butler (born January 10, 1994) is an American model and beauty pageant titleholder who was crowned both Miss World America 2018 and Miss Earth USA 2021. As a national titleholder, Butler represented the United States at Miss World 2018, placing in the top thirty, and then represented the United States at Miss Earth 2021. Previously, Butler had been crowned Miss Maine USA 2016 and represented Maine at Miss USA 2016, where she was unplaced.

Pageantry

2011-2015: Early Years
Butler began her pageantry career in 2011 representing Bonny Eagle in the Miss Maine Teen USA 2012 competition. Butler placed as first runner up to winner Molly Fitzpatrick.

Butler then went on to compete in the Miss Maine Scholarship Program, which selects the representative of Maine to the Miss America pageant. Butler placed fourth runner up to Miss Maine 2012, Molly Bouchard, and was first runner up to both Miss Maine 2013, Kristin Korda, and Miss Maine 2014 Audrey Thames. Following her placement as first runner up in 2013, she was invited to represent Maine at the National Sweetheart Pageant where she won the People's Choice award.

2016: Miss USA
Butler then returned to the Miss USA system, representing her home town of Standish and was crowned as the winner Miss Maine USA 2016 succeeding outgoing Miss Maine USA 2015 Heather Marie Elwell. She represented Maine at Miss USA 2016 pageant that was held at the T-Mobile Arena in Las Vegas, Nevada on June 5, 2016. The pageant was won by Deshauna Barber of District of Columbia.

2018: Miss California 
Butler then moved to San Diego, California where she competed for and won the title of Miss San Diego 2018, which was the organization's 100th anniversary. At Miss San Diego, she won the Interview Award, The Talent Award, and Miss Photogenic. She then went on to compete in the Miss California competition, where she won the Lifestyle and Fitness in Swimsuit Preliminary award, and placed in the Top 15.

2018: Miss World America 2018 and Miss World 2018
On 19 September 2018, Butler was crowned as Miss World America 2018, succeeding the outgoing Miss World America 2017 and Miss World 2017 Top 40 semifinalist, Clarissa Bowers. As Miss World America, Butler represented the United States at Miss World 2018 pageant in Sanya, China. Butler placed in the top 18 of the Miss World Talent competition singing Puccini's aria, Nessun Dorma. She also won the Miss World Sports Challenge Fast Track Event, granting her a place in the Top 30 of Miss World 2018 final. The competition was won by Miss Mexico, Vanessa Ponce De León.

2020-2021: Miss Earth USA and Miss Earth 2021
Butler was initially set up to join Miss Earth USA 2020 representing Maine. The organization gave the delegates an option to be part of the virtual pageant setup for the 2020 finals and could still be a delegate for the following year with an actual pageant. Butler chose to be part of the 2021, instead.

In January 2021, Butler was hailed as the 2021 Miss Earth USA, succeeding Miss Earth USA 2020 Lindsey Coffey who eventually won the title of Miss Earth 2020.

Butler represented USA in the Miss Earth 2021 pageant, which was conducted virtually for the second consecutive year due to the COVID-19 pandemic. She ended up as Miss Earth-Air 2021 which is unofficially equivalent to 1st runner-up.

Special Award: 
 Singing talent
 Sportswear Competition

Personal life
On December 20, 2021. Butler got engaged to her boyfriend Jaime Ford for being in a relationship for over two years.

Notes

References

External links

Living people
1994 births
Miss World 2018 delegates
People from Standish, Maine
Miss World America
American female models
American beauty pageant winners
Miss USA 2016 delegates
Miss Earth 2021 contestants